St. John's College is a private liberal arts college with campuses in Annapolis, Maryland, and Santa Fe, New Mexico. As the successor institution of King William's School, a preparatory school founded in 1696, St. John's is one of the oldest institutions of higher learning in the United States; the current institution received a collegiate charter in 1784. In 1937, St. John's adopted a Great Books curriculum based on discussion of works from the Western canon of philosophical, religious, historical, mathematical, scientific, and literary works.

The college grants a single bachelor's degree, in liberal arts. The awarded degree is equivalent to a double major in philosophy and the history of science, and a double minor in classical studies and comparative literature.

Two master's degrees are available through the college's graduate institute: one in liberal arts, which is a modified version of the undergraduate curriculum (differing mostly in that the graduate students are not restricted to a set sequence of courses), and one in Eastern Classics, which applies most of the features of the undergraduate curriculum (seminars, preceptorials, language study, and a set sequence of courses) to a list of classic works from India, China, and Japan. The Master of Arts in Eastern Classics is only available at the Santa Fe campus.

History

Old program
St. John's College traces its origins to King William's School, founded in 1696.  King William's School was founded with an affiliation to the Church of England. In 1784, Maryland chartered St. John's College, which absorbed King William's School when it opened in 1785.  The college took up residence in a building known as Bladen's Folly (the current McDowell Hall), which was originally built to be the Maryland governor's mansion, but was not completed. There was some association with the Freemasons early in the college's history, leading to speculation that it was named after Saint John the Evangelist. The college's original charter, reflecting the Masonic value of religious tolerance as well as the religious diversity of the founders (which included Presbyterians, Episcopalians, and the Roman Catholic Charles Carroll of Carrollton) stated that "youth of all religious denominations shall be freely and liberally admitted".  The college always maintained a small size, generally enrolling fewer than 500 men at a time.

In its early years, the college was at least nominally public—the college's founders had envisaged it as the Western Shore branch of a proposed “University of Maryland”—but a lack of enthusiasm from the Maryland General Assembly and its Eastern Shore counterpart, Washington College, made this largely a paper institution. After years of inconsistent funding and litigation, the college accepted a smaller annual grant in lieu of being funded through the state's annual appropriations process.  During the Civil War, the college closed and its campus was used as a military hospital. In 1907 it became the undergraduate college of a loosely organized "University of Maryland" that included the professional schools located in Baltimore. By 1920, when Maryland State College (founded in 1857 as Maryland Agricultural College) became the University of Maryland at College Park, St. John's was a free-standing private institution.

The college curriculum has taken various forms throughout its history. It began with a general program of study in the liberal arts, but St. John's was a military school for much of the late 19th century and early 20th century.  It ended compulsory military training with Major Enoch Garey's accession as president in 1923.
Garey and the Navy instituted a Naval Reserve unit in September 1924, creating the first-ever collegiate Department of Naval Science in the United States.  But despite St. John's successfully pioneering the entire NROTC movement, student interest waned, the voluntary ROTC disappeared in 1926 with Garey's departure, and the Naval Reserve unit followed by 1929.

New program

In 1936, the college lost its accreditation. The Board of Visitors and Governors, faced with dire financial straits caused by the Great Depression, invited educational innovators Stringfellow Barr and Scott Buchanan to make a completely fresh start. They introduced a new program of study, which remains in effect today. Buchanan became dean of the college, while Barr assumed its presidency. In his guide Cool Colleges, Donald Asher writes that the New Program was implemented to save the college from closing: "Several benefactors convinced the college to reject a watered-down curriculum in favor of becoming a very distinctive academic community. Thus this great institution was reborn as a survival measure."

In 1938, Walter Lippman wrote a column praising liberal arts education as a bulwark against fascism, and said, "In the future, men will point to St. John's College and say that there was the seed-bed of the American renaissance."

In 1940, national attention was attracted to St. John's by a story in Life entitled "The Classics: At St. John's They Come into Their Own Once More". Classic works unavailable in English translation were translated by faculty members, typed, mimeographed, and bound. They were sold to the general public as well as to students, and by 1941 the St. John's College bookshop was famous as the only source for English translations of works such as Copernicus's De revolutionibus orbium coelestium, St. Augustine's De Musica, and Ptolemy's Almagest.

The wartime years were difficult for the all-male St. John's. Enlistment and the draft all but emptied the college; 15 seniors graduated in 1943, eight in 1945, and three in 1946. From 1940 to 1946, St. John's was repeatedly confronted with threats of its land being seized by the Navy for expansion of the neighboring U.S. Naval Academy, and James Forrestal, Secretary of the Navy, formally announced plans to do so in 1945. At the time, The New York Times, which had expected a legal battle royale comparable to the 1819 Dartmouth case, commented that "although a small college of fewer than 200 students, St. John's has, because of its experimental liberal arts program, received more publicity and been the center of a greater academic controversy than most other colleges in the land. Its best-books program has been attacked and praised by leading educators of the day."

The constant threat of eviction discouraged Stringfellow Barr. In late 1946 Forrestal withdrew the plan to take over St. John's in the face of public opposition and the disapproval of the House Naval Affairs Committee, but Barr and Scott Buchanan were already committed to leaving St. John's and launching Liberal Arts, Inc., a new, similar college in Stockbridge, Massachusetts; that project eventually failed—but thinking about other sites for the college eventually led to the opening of St. John's second campus in Santa Fe in 1964.

St John's had been founded as an all-white institution and continued as such in the early years of the New Program, with Barr actively discouraging black students from applying. However, by 1948 faculty and student sentiment had shifted and students, with the support of the faculty and administration, persuaded a reluctant Board of Visitors and Governors to integrate the college and St. John's became the one of the first previously all-white colleges south of the Mason-Dixon line to admit black students voluntarily.

In 1949, Richard D. Weigle became president of St. John's. Following the chaotic and difficult period from 1940 to 1949, Weigle's presidency continued for 31 years, during which time the New Program and the college itself became well established.

In 1951, St. John's became coeducational, admitting women for the first time in its then-254-year history. There was some objection from students because they had not been involved in—nor even aware of—the decision before it was announced to the media, and from some who believed that the college could not remain a serious institution were it to admit women. Martin Dyer reported that women who were admitted quickly proved they were the academic and intellectual equals of their male counterparts.

As enrollment grew during the 1950s, and facing the coming larger baby-boom generation, thoughts turned again towards opening another campus—but this time in addition to, not instead of, the one in Annapolis. Serious talk of expansion began in 1959 when the father of a student from Monterey, California, suggested to President Weigle that he establish a new campus there. Time ran an article on the college's possible expansion plans, and 32 offers came in to the college from New Hampshire, Oregon, Georgia, Alaska, Florida, Connecticut, and other states.

A group from the Monterey Peninsula told Weigle that they were definitely interested, though funding was a problem, and suitable land was a big question. There was also an offer of land in Claremont, California, but competition with the other colleges there for students and financial contributions was a negative. The Riverside Mission Inn (in Riverside, California) was another possibility, but with only  of land and many renovations needed to the inn, funding was again a major issue.

The three California locations were all still major contenders when Robert McKinney (publisher of The Santa Fe New Mexican and a former SJC board member) called and told Weigle that a group of city leaders had long been looking for another college for Santa Fe. During a lunch Weigle attended at John Gaw Meem's house on the outskirts of Santa Fe in late January 1961, Meem volunteered that he had a little piece of land that he would gladly donate to the college. After lunch, Weigle looked at the land and instantly fell in love with it. A committee of four faculty members (Robert Bart, Barbara Leonard, Douglas Allanbrook, and William Darkey) later visited the four sites in contention and, after much deliberation, recommended Santa Fe.

In 1961, the governing board of St. John's approved plans to establish a second college at Santa Fe. Groundbreaking occurred on April 22, 1963, and the first classes began in 1964. As it turned out, shortly afterwards land was also donated to the college on the Monterey Peninsula, on condition that a campus be developed there by a certain date.

Academics

Great Books program
The Great Books program (often called simply "the Program" or "the New Program" at St. John's) was developed at the University of Chicago by Stringfellow Barr, Scott Buchanan, Robert Hutchins, and Mortimer Adler in the mid-1930s as an alternative form of education to the then rapidly changing undergraduate curriculum. St. John's adopted the Great Books program in 1937, when the college was facing the possibility of financial and academic ruin. The Great Books program in use today was also heavily influenced by Jacob Klein, who was dean of the college in the 1940s and 1950s.

The four-year program of study, nearly all of which is mandatory, requires that students read and discuss the works of many of Western civilization's most prominent contributors to philosophy, theology, mathematics, science, music, poetry, and literature. Tutorials (mathematics, language, and music), as well as seminar and laboratory, are discussion-based. In the mathematics tutorial students often demonstrate propositions that mathematicians throughout various ages have laid out. In the language tutorial student translations are presented (ancient Greek is studied in the first two years and French for the last two). The tutorials, with seminar and laboratory, constitute the classes. All classes, and in particular the seminar, are considered formal exercises; consequently, students address one another, as well as their teachers, by their honorific and last name during class.

St. John's avoids modern textbooks, lectures, and examinations, in favor of a series of manuals. While traditional (A to F) grades are given and provided on transcripts, the culture of the school de-emphasizes their importance and grades are released only at the request of the student. Grading is based largely on class participation and papers. Tutors, as faculty members are called at the college, play a non-directive role in the classroom, compared to mainstream colleges. However, at St. John's this varies by course and instructor. Class size is small on both campuses, with a student to tutor ratio of 7:1. Seminar is the largest class, with around 20 students, but led by two tutors. Daytime tutorials are smaller, typically ranging between 12 and 16 students and are led by one tutor. Preceptorials are the smallest class size, ranging between 3 and 9 students.

The Program involves:
 Four years of literature, philosophy, and political science in seminar
 Four years of mathematics
 Three years of laboratory science
 Four years of language (Ancient Greek, Middle/Early English, and French)
 Freshman year chorus followed by sophomore year music

The Great Books are not the only texts used at St. John's. Greek and French classes make use of supplemental materials that are more like traditional textbooks. Science laboratory courses and mathematics courses use manuals prepared by faculty members that combine source materials with workbook exercises. For example, the mathematics tutorial combines a 1905 paper by Albert Einstein with exercises that require the student to work through the mathematics used in the paper.

Reading list
Although it varies from year to year and differs slightly between campuses, the Great Books reading list is the basis of the school's curriculum.

Freshman year

 Homer: Iliad, Odyssey
 Aeschylus: Agamemnon, Libation Bearers, The Eumenides, Prometheus Bound
 Sophocles: Oedipus Rex, Oedipus at Colonus, Antigone, Philoctetes, Ajax
 Thucydides: Peloponnesian War
 Euripides: Hippolytus, The Bacchae
 Herodotus: Histories
 Aristophanes: Clouds, Frogs
 Plato: Meno, Gorgias, Republic, Apology, Crito, Phaedo, Symposium, Parmenides, Theaetetus, Sophist, Timaeus, Phaedrus
 Aristotle: Poetics, Physics, Metaphysics, Nicomachean Ethics, On Generation and Corruption, Politics, Parts of Animals, Generation of Animals 
 Euclid: Elements
 Lucretius: On the Nature of Things
 Plutarch: "Lycurgus" and "Solon" from the Parallel Lives
 Ptolemy: Almagest
 Blaise Pascal: Treatise on the Equilibrium of Liquids
 Nicomachus: Arithmetic
 Antoine Lavoisier: Elements of Chemistry
 William Harvey: Motion of the Heart and Blood
 Essays by: Archimedes, Gabriel Fahrenheit, Amedeo Avogadro, John Dalton, Stanislao Cannizzaro, Rudolf Virchow, Edme Mariotte, Hans Adolf Eduard Driesch, Joseph Louis Gay-Lussac, Hans Spemann, Guy Beckley Stearns, J. J. Thomson, Dmitri Mendeleev, Claude Louis Berthollet, Joseph Proust

Sophomore year

 Hebrew Bible
 New Testament
 Aristotle: De Anima
 Apollonius: Conics
 Virgil: Aeneid
 Plutarch: "Caesar", "Cato the Younger", "Antony", and "Brutus" from the Parallel Lives
 Epictetus: Discourses, Manual
 Tacitus: Annals
 Ptolemy: Almagest
 Plotinus: The Enneads
 Augustine of Hippo: Confessions
 Maimonides: Guide for the Perplexed
 Anselm of Canterbury: Proslogium
 Thomas Aquinas: Summa Theologica
 Dante: Divine Comedy
 Geoffrey Chaucer: Canterbury Tales
 Niccolò Machiavelli: The Prince, Discourses
 Nicolaus Copernicus: On the Revolutions of the Spheres
 Johannes Kepler: Epitome IV
 Livy: Early History of Rome
 Giovanni Pierluigi da Palestrina: Missa Papae Marcelli
 Michel de Montaigne: Essays
 François Viète: Introduction to the Analytical Art
 Francis Bacon: Novum Organum
 William Shakespeare: Richard II, Henry IV, Part 1, Henry IV, Part 2, The Tempest, As You Like It, Hamlet, Othello, Macbeth, King Lear, Sonnets
 Poems by: Andrew Marvell, John Donne, and other 16th- and 17th-century poets
 René Descartes: Geometry, Discourse on Method
 Blaise Pascal: Generation of Conic Sections
 Johann Sebastian Bach: St. Matthew Passion, Inventions
 Joseph Haydn: Quartets
 Wolfgang Amadeus Mozart: Operas
 Ludwig van Beethoven: Third Symphony
 Franz Schubert: Songs
 Alessandro Striggio (music by Claudio Monteverdi): L'Orfeo
 Igor Stravinsky: Symphony of Psalms

Junior year

 Miguel de Cervantes: Don Quixote
 Galileo Galilei: Two New Sciences
 Thomas Hobbes: Leviathan
 René Descartes: Meditations, Rules for the Direction of the Mind
 John Milton: Paradise Lost
 François de La Rochefoucauld: Maximes
 Jean de La Fontaine: Fables
 Blaise Pascal: Pensées
 Christiaan Huygens: Treatise on Light, On the Movement of Bodies by Impact
 George Eliot: Middlemarch
 Baruch Spinoza: Theologico-Political Treatise
 John Locke: Second Treatise of Government
 Jean Racine: Phèdre
 Isaac Newton: Principia Mathematica
 Johannes Kepler: Epitome IV
 Gottfried Leibniz: Monadology, Discourse on Metaphysics, Essay on Dynamics, Philosophical Essays, Principles of Nature and Grace
 Jonathan Swift: Gulliver's Travels
 David Hume: Treatise of Human Nature
 Jean-Jacques Rousseau: Social Contract, The Origin of Inequality
 Molière: Le Misanthrope
 Adam Smith: Wealth of Nations
 Immanuel Kant: Critique of Pure Reason, Foundations of the Metaphysics of Morals
 Lorenzo Da Ponte (music by Wolfgang Amadeus Mozart): Don Giovanni
 Jane Austen: Pride and Prejudice, Emma
 Richard Dedekind: Essay on the Theory of Numbers
 Articles of Confederation
 The U.S. Declaration of Independence
 The Constitution of the United States of America
 Alexander Hamilton, James Madison, and John Jay: The Federalist Papers
 Mark Twain: Adventures of Huckleberry Finn
 William Wordsworth: The Two-Part Prelude of 1799
 Essays by: Thomas Young, Brook Taylor, Leonhard Euler, Daniel Bernoulli, Hans Christian Ørsted, André-Marie Ampère, Michael Faraday, James Clerk Maxwell

Senior year

 Supreme Court opinions
 Johann Wolfgang von Goethe: Faust
 Charles Darwin: The Origin of Species
 Georg Wilhelm Friedrich Hegel: Phenomenology of Spirit, "Logic" (from the Encyclopedia)
 Nikolai Ivanovich Lobachevsky: Theory of Parallels
 Franz Kafka: The Metamorphosis
 Plato: Phaedrus
 Alexis de Tocqueville: Democracy in America
 Documents from American History
 Abraham Lincoln: Selected Speeches
 Frederick Douglass: Selected Speeches
 Søren Kierkegaard: Philosophical Fragments, Fear and Trembling
 Richard Wagner: Tristan and Isolde
 Karl Marx: Capital, Political and Economic Manuscripts of 1844, The German Ideology
 Fyodor Dostoevsky: The Brothers Karamazov
 Leo Tolstoy: War and Peace
 Herman Melville: Benito Cereno
 Flannery O'Connor: Selected Stories
 Sigmund Freud: Introductory Lectures on Psychoanalysis
 Charles Baudelaire: Les Fleurs du Mal
 Booker T. Washington: Selected Writings
 W. E. B. Du Bois: The Souls of Black Folk
 Edmund Husserl: Crisis of the European Sciences
 Martin Heidegger: Basic Writings
 Albert Einstein: Selected Papers
 Joseph Conrad: Heart of Darkness
 William Faulkner: Go Down Moses
 Gustave Flaubert: Un Coeur Simple
 Virginia Woolf: Mrs. Dalloway, To The Lighthouse
 Poems by: W. B. Yeats, T. S. Eliot, Wallace Stevens, Paul Valéry, Arthur Rimbaud
 Essays by: Michael Faraday, J. J. Thomson, Hermann Minkowski, Ernest Rutherford, Clinton Davisson, Erwin Schrödinger, Niels Bohr, James Clerk Maxwell, Louis-Victor de Broglie, Werner Heisenberg, Gregor Mendel, Theodor Boveri, Walter Sutton, Thomas Hunt Morgan, George Wells Beadle & Edward Lawrie Tatum, Gerald Jay Sussman, James D. Watson & Francis Crick, François Jacob & Jacques Monod, G. H. Hardy

Graduate Institute Liberal Arts program
The Graduate Institute in Liberal Education was established at St. John's College in 1967 as a summer program on the Santa Fe campus. The size and scope of the Institute have expanded so that currently both the Annapolis and Santa Fe campuses offer year-round graduate-level study based on the principles of the St. John's undergraduate program. Students in the Liberal Arts program explore the persisting questions of human existence by studying classic works of the western tradition. This program is organized into five semester-long thematic segments: Philosophy and Theology, Politics and Society, Literature, Mathematics and Natural Science, and History. Students earn a Master of Arts in Liberal Arts (MALA) by completing four of these five segments. A common curriculum provides the basis for a shared intellectual community; discussion with fellow students and faculty is the mode of learning both inside and outside the classroom. Each semester, students attend a seminar, a tutorial and a preceptorial—all carried out as small-group discussions under the guidance of St. John's faculty members. These three types of classes are the framework of the distinctive St. John's educational experience.

Eastern Classics program
At the Santa Fe campus, there is a program offering a Master of Arts in Eastern Classics (MAEC). This program is three semesters long and is designed to be completed in one 12-month period. The impetus for the program came with the recognition that the undergraduate program simply could not do justice to the Great Books of the three main Asian traditions (India, China and Japan) by trying to squeeze in a few works among so many European masterworks. The EC program therefore provides a full set of readings in the philosophical, religious and literary traditions of the three cultures listed above. Thus, students learn Chinese culture by reading not only Confucius, Laozi and Zhuangzi, but also Mencius, Xun Zi, Han Feizi, and Mozi, as well as historical narratives by Sima Qian and the Zuo Zhuan, the later movement of Neo-Confucianism and Zhu Xi, narrative works such as Journey to the West or the Romance of the Three Kingdoms and the great Chinese poets, Li Bai, Wang Wei and Du Fu. This list represents only one-third of the required corpus, which also covers the major teachings and branches of Hinduism and the development of Theravada, Mahayana and Zen Buddhism, as well as such literary masterpieces as the Mahabharata, Shakuntala, The Tale of Genji, The Narrow Road to the Deep North and others. Students also take a language, either Sanskrit or Classical Chinese.

Campuses

Annapolis campus
St. John's is located in the Historic Annapolis district, one block away from the Maryland State Capitol building. Its proximity to the United States Naval Academy (across King George Street) has inspired many a comparison to Athens and Sparta. The schools carry on a spirited rivalry seen in the annual croquet match between the two schools on the front lawn of St. John's, which has been called by GQ "the purest intercollegiate athletic event in America."  St. John's has won 29 of the 36 annual matches. About the Johnnies' commitment to the event, one midshipman commented, "They're out practicing croquet every afternoon! Alabama should take football this seriously."

Construction of McDowell Hall at the center of campus was begun in 1742 by Provincial Governor of Maryland Thomas Bladen, but was not completed until after the end of the Colonial period. The 23,000-square-foot historic building underwent some improvements in 2017–18. Its Great Hall has seen many college events, from balls feting Generals Lafayette and Washington to the unique St. John's institutions called waltz parties.

Mellon Hall, constructed in 1958, was designed by noted architect Richard Neutra.

St. John's College Observatory
The observatory facility, located at the top of the Foucault pendulum tower in Mellon Hall, contains two permanently mounted telescopes, a 12" Schmidt–Cassegrain telescope model LX200 and a 16" Newtonian telescope, both made by Meade Instruments. The Foucault Pendulum is located at the top of the four-story tower. The pendulum drive magnet is housed within a cast iron cone in the Observatory facility. The magnet is keyed to turn on and off as the pendulum swings by using technology such as a photoresistor that determine the center of the pendulum's swing.

Santa Fe campus

St. John's Santa Fe campus is located on the eastern edge of Santa Fe, close to Atalaya Mountain. It was opened in 1964 in response to the increase in qualified applicants at the Annapolis campus. The college chose to open a second campus rather than increase the size of the Annapolis campus. The second campus was part of a larger project to construct six campuses across the country. St. John's abandoned the concept when it later sold a tract of land it owned in Monterey, California.

Student body
Within the Class of 2022, 36 U.S. states and 15 countries are represented. Approximately 99% of students receive financial aid. First-year undergraduate students range in age from 15 to 65. The student body is relatively small compared to other liberal arts colleges, with a population historically below 500 students on each campus during a year. The college offers many community seminars and lectures that are available to the public.

Notable people associated with St. John's

See also
 Colonial Colleges: Details on St. John's antiquity vis-a-vis other old U.S. colleges
 Educational perennialism
 Narrative evaluation
 Western canon
 Santa Fe Institute
 Saint Mary's College of California (Moraga), Integral Program

Notes

References

Further reading
 Racing Odysseus: A College President Becomes a Freshman Again  A former college president attended St. John's College and wrote a memoir about his experience reading Homer, rowing Crew, and examining the importance of a liberal arts education in today's society.
 Where I learned to Read Salvatore Scibona, The New Yorker, 2011-06-13

External links
 

 
1784 establishments in Maryland
Buildings and structures in Annapolis, Maryland
Buildings and structures in Santa Fe, New Mexico
Education in Santa Fe, New Mexico
Educational institutions established in 1784
Liberal arts colleges in Maryland
Liberal arts colleges in New Mexico
1696 establishments in Massachusetts
Historic districts on the National Register of Historic Places in New Mexico
Private universities and colleges in New Mexico
Private universities and colleges in Maryland